Silent '88 is second full-length album by English band Hood.  Both the CD and LP versions were released on the Slumberland Records label in 1996.

Track listing

References

External links 
Hood Homepage
Slumberland Records

1996 albums
Hood (band) albums